The FK Baku 2005-06 season was Baku's eighth Azerbaijan Premier League season.

Squad

Transfers

Summer

In:

Out:

Winter

In:

Out:

Competitions

Azerbaijan Premier League

Results

Table

Azerbaijan Cup

UEFA Cup

First qualifying round

Squad statistics

Appearances and goals

|-
|colspan="14"|Players away from Baku on loan:
|-
|colspan="14"|Players who appeared for Baku that left during the season:

|}

Goal Scorers

References
Qarabağ have played their home games at the Tofiq Bahramov Stadium since 1993 due to the ongoing situation in Quzanlı.

FC Baku seasons
Baku